André Prudhommeaux (15 October 1902 – 13 November 1968 ) was a French anarchist bookstore owner whose shop in Paris specialized in social history and was a place for many debates and discussions. He was an agronomist, libertarian, editor of Le Libertaire and Le Monde Libertaire, writer, and journalist. 

Prudhommeaux was born in Guise, Aisne.  He was an early Council Communist, then an anarchist. He wrote for many publications, edited a few, and co-authored books with Dora Ris. He participated in the defense campaign for Marinus van der Lubbe in 1933 and was a supporter of the Friends of Durruti during the Spanish Revolution of 1936.

External links 
 André Prudhommeaux Papers International Institute of Social History (IISH)
 Prudhommeaux Daily Bleed November (References and links)

1902 births
1968 deaths
People from Aisne
French anarchists
French socialists